Young Labour is the combined youth wing and student wing of the New Zealand Labour Party. It hosts an annual conference and holds a range of additional national events, including fringe sessions at the Labour Party's annual conference. All Labour Party members aged between 15 and 29 years old are members of Young Labour.

Activities
Young Labour has worked on issues ranging from climate change and improved rental housing standards to liquor law reform and to opposing voluntary student membership. On the 15th of February 2022, the Conversion Practices Prohibition Legislation Bill passed its third and final reading. The Bill was brought to Parliament as a result of a joint petition presented by Young Labour and the Young Greens on the 14th of August, 2018. That petition initially resulted in a Members Bill placed in the ballot by Labour MP Marja Lubeck.

Although Young Labour is not an organisation which necessarily leads to a political career in Parliament, many of the Fifth Labour Government's Cabinet, including former Prime Minister Helen Clark and former Labour Party leader Phil Goff began their political activism in Young Labour, as did Sixth Labour Government prime ministers Jacinda Ardern and Chris Hipkins.

Conference
The Young Labour Conference, held annually, and doubling as the sector's Annual General Meeting, is the highest decision-making body of Young Labour. It elects the Executive, alters the Constitution and decides the sector's policy priorities for the current year. The Conference also functions as a social and activism highlight on the Young Labour calendar, with addresses from Members of Parliament and activities such as canvassing commonly being a part of the programme.

Policy Priorities

Each year Young Labour selects a number of policy priorities at its conference. These become the target for Young Labour members to ensure their passage at the Annual Conference of the Labour Party. These are advanced by Young Labour members playing an active role in debates at the Regional and Annual Conferences of the Party. In addition, Young Labour elects a representative to the Party's Policy Council who plays a role in ensuring Young Labour members' policy ideas are heard in the party.

Campaigns
Young Labour is an important part of the Labour Party's volunteer base at national and local elections. Young Labour members are involved in canvassing, election-day volunteering, and campaign managing across the country. Young Labour also runs public campaigns on certain political or policy issues that the sector deems important to young people. In addition, Young Labour runs an annual Campaign Leadership School to train members in the skills of executing successful political campaigns, and a Summer School (open to the wider party) to have discussions and workshops on the wider direction of Labour in government and in opposition.

Structure

Executive Committee
The Executive Committee is elected annually at the Young Labour Conference. The Executive Committee is made up of a President, Māori Vice President, Women's Vice President, Regional Vice President, Secretary, Treasurer, International Officer, Policy and Campaigns Officer, Communications Officer, Policy Council Representative, and Youth Vice-President. The Youth Vice-President is an ex officio role on the committee, and is voted on by the Party's membership at its Annual Conference, however Young Labour chooses a candidate to endorse.

Regional Committee
The Regional Committee is elected annually at the Young Labour Conference and is made up of representatives from every region, as well as branch chairs from across the country.

Sector Committee
The Sector Committee is elected annually at the Young Labour Conference. The Sector Committee is chaired by the Māori Vice President and Women's Vice President. It is made up of a Rainbow Organiser, Māori Co-Organisers, a Women's Organiser, a Pasifika Organiser, a Kirk Organiser (representing the disabled community), Affiliates Organiser (representing union members), Rural and Regional Organiser, Local Government Organiser, and Multicultural Organiser.

Regions and Branches
In line with the organisation of the wider Labour Party, Young Labour is organised into six geographical regions for the purposes of campaigns and policy debate.

Within these regions, the primary unit of organisation are a number of Special Branches or University Branches of the Labour Party. Some, like Princes Street Labour and VicLabour are based around universities, whereas others are based in regional centres.

The current active branches are:
 Christchurch Young Labour, based in Canterbury
 Southern Young Labour, based in Otago and Southland 
 Princes Street Labour, based in Auckland
 VicLabour, based in Wellington
 AUT Labour, based in the various Auckland University of Technology campuses 
Young Labour Auckland North, based on the North Shore

Sexual assault scandal

In February 2018, allegations of multiple sexual assaults at the Labour youth summer school in Waihi by a 20-year-old man emerged. The Police subsequently launched an investigation and laid five indecent assault charges against the alleged perpetrator, before withdrawing one of them, citing an administrative error. Labour Leader Jacinda Ardern, Prime Minister of New Zealand, was not informed of the allegations immediately, and learnt of them from a journalist moments after the story was published. The Labour Party itself was aware of the allegations, but failed to tell the party leader, Jacinda Ardern. As a result of the allegations the Labour Party suspended all youth party events and launched an investigation into the sexual assaults and allegations of underage drinking at Labour youth events. Once this report was completed, however, Ardern declined to release the report publicly, citing the charges still before the courts.

A Young Labour Summer School did not take place in 2019, which many commentators attributed to the controversy surrounding the previous year's summer camp. The alleged perpetrator pleaded not guilty to six charges of indecent assault in July 2018 and was granted interim name suppression. In September 2018, the Crown dropped two of these charges against the accused. On 2 September 2019, trial proceedings against the defendant began at the Auckland District Court. During the trial, the defence lawyer John Munro accused one of the victims of making up parts of history and exaggerating the incident. On 4 September 2019, the defendant pleaded guilty to two amended charges of assault against two young men while the two remaining assault charges against the two women involved were dismissed.

Further reading
The Young Labour leader keeping it real, and realistic - a short documentary following the chair of Princes Street Labour prior to the 2020 election

See also
VicLabour
Princes Street Labour
New Zealand Labour Party
New Zealand Union of Students' Associations

Notes

External links
 Official website

Youth wings of social democratic parties
Youth wings of political parties in New Zealand
New Zealand Labour Party